Justin Crawford (20 March 1977 – 21 July 2022) was an Australian rules footballer who played with Sydney and Hawthorn in the Australian Football League (AFL) during the 1990s.

Crawford, the younger brother of Brownlow Medal winner Shane, was recruited from Tocumwal in the Murray Football League by Sydney as a zone selection. He was just 18 when he made his debut in 1995 and earned an AFL Rising Star nomination for a 26-disposal and two-goal game against Fitzroy. An on-baller, Crawford took part in Sydney's qualifying final win over Hawthorn in 1996 but had just seven disposals and was dropped for the preliminary final to make way for Tony Lockett's return.

He joined his brother at Hawthorn in 1997 after being traded for David McEwan and the 17th selection of the 1996 AFL draft, used on Rowan Warfe. Playing mostly as a forward, Crawford put together 15 games in 1997 and during the year was fined $1000 over an incident at Crown Casino, in which he urinated under a gambling table. He retired from the AFL at the end of the 1998 season, aged just 21.

He resurfaced in the Western Australian Football League (WAFL) to play with South Fremantle and was part of the club's premiership in 2005 but left the club at the end of that year.

Death
Crawford died suddenly on 21 July 2022; no detail was initially provided on the cause of death.  He was 45.

References

1977 births
2022 deaths
Sydney Swans players
Hawthorn Football Club players
Australian rules footballers from New South Wales
South Fremantle Football Club players